Trevor Waring (birth registered third ¼ 1945) is an English former professional rugby league footballer who played in the 1960s. He played at club level for Castleford (Heritage № 482).

Background
Trevor Waring's birth was registered in Pontefract district, West Riding of Yorkshire, England.

Playing career

County League appearances
Trevor Waring played in Castleford's victory in the Yorkshire County League during the 1964–65.

References

External links
Search for "Waring" at rugbyleagueproject.org
Trevor Waring Memory Box Search at archive.castigersheritage.com

1945 births
Living people
Castleford Tigers players
English rugby league players
Rugby league players from Pontefract